Agdistis sabokyi is a moth of the family Pterophoridae. It is found in Turkey (including Ankara Province). The habitat consists of heavily grazed short-grass steppe mainly on volcanic rock, with Artemisia, Amygdalus, Stipa and other grass species.

The wingspan is about 28 mm. The ground colour of the forewings is dark brown-greyish, with three brown dots on the costa. The hindwings are light brown-greyish
 Adults have been recorded in May.

References

Moths described in 2000
Agdistinae
Endemic fauna of Turkey